Hotel Paradiso is a 1966 British comedy film released by Metro-Goldwyn-Mayer in Panavision. It was directed by Peter Glenville and based on the play L'Hôtel du libre échange by Maurice Desvallières and Georges Feydeau. The film allowed Alec Guinness to reprise the role he had played in the London West End theatre production of Hotel Paradiso, which opened at the Winter Garden Theatre, Drury Lane, London. on 2 May 1956. Guinness played alongside Martita Hunt (Angelique), Irene Worth (Marcelle), Frank Pettingell (Cot), Kenneth Williams (Maxime) and Billie Whitelaw (Victoire). Douglas Byng also reprised his part from the stage play.

Plot
Playwright Monsieur Feydeau is staying in the Parisian Hotel Paradiso. He needs to write a new play, but has writer's block. He takes the opportunity to observe his fellow guests: Monsieur Boniface, henpecked by his domineering wife, and Marcelle, the beautiful but neglected wife of Henri, a building inspector. Henri is sent to the hotel to investigate rumours of ghosts (which turn out to be caused by drains). However, the hotel is the trysting place of Marcelle and Boniface, who are having an affair.

In the 'by-the-hour' hotel, there are two husbands and one wife, plus Henri's nephew and Boniface's maid, who are also having an affair. Marcelle and Boniface's affair is severely compromised (not least by a police raid). All these events provide Feydeau with the material for his play, which becomes the succès fou of the next season.

Cast
 Alec Guinness as Benedict Boniface 
 Gina Lollobrigida as Marcelle Cotte 
 Robert Morley as Henri Cotte 
 David Battley as George 
 Ann Beach as Victoire
 Marie Bell as la Grande Antoinette 
 Douglas Byng as Mr. Martin
 Derek Fowlds as Maxime
 Eddra Gale as Guest
 Peter Glenville as the Playwright
 Robertson Hare as the Duke 
 Darío Moreno as the Turk 
 Peggy Mount as Angelique Boniface 
 Leonard Rossiter as the Inspector 
 Akim Tamiroff as Anniello

References

External links
 
 
 
 

1966 films
1966 comedy films
Metro-Goldwyn-Mayer films
British films based on plays
Films based on works by Georges Feydeau
Adultery in films
Films set in hotels
Films set in Paris
Films set in the 1900s
British comedy films
Films scored by Laurence Rosenthal
Films directed by Peter Glenville
1960s English-language films
1960s British films